Phoxomylus is an extinct genus of palaechthonid plesiadapiform which existed in Alberta, Canada, during the late Paleocene (earliest Tiffanian age). It was first named by Richard C. Fox in 2011 and the type species is Phoxomylus puncticuspis. The holotype exposed in Paskapoo Formation by Gordon P. Youzwyshyn on 10 July 1988.

References

Plesiadapiformes
Prehistoric placental genera
Paleocene mammals
Fossil taxa described in 2011
Fossils of Canada
Paleontology in Alberta